Mysore Race Course is a racing track in Mysore city of Karnataka province, India.

History
Mysore Race Course was started in 1891 by the king of Mysore Chamaraja Wadiyar. The original location of the Race Course was near the present J.C.College.  In 1920 a new race course was built on a 152-acre land.  The races were affiliated to the Royal Calcutta Turf Club. The Bangalore Race Club was formed in 1951 and started to run the Mysore races also.  The present race course was leased from the Karnataka government in the year 1977. The new facility of the race course at the foot of the Chamundi hills was built by Krishnaraja Wadiyar in 1906.

Facilities

There are 250 members in the Mysore Race Club. The racing track is 2,000 meters long and 30 meters wide. The straight is 500 meters.</ref>

The season
The Mysore Derby season is from November to February and again from May to July.

See also
 Lalithadripura

Image gallery

References

Buildings and structures in Mysore
Horse racing venues in India
Sports venues in Mysore
1891 establishments in India
Sports venues completed in 1891